Beau Anderson (born 25 December 1982) is an Australian former professional darts player who played within the Professional Darts Corporation (PDC) from 2013 to 2017.

Personal life
Beau's brother was the late Kyle Anderson who was also a Darts player.

Beau and Kyle had a close relationship and regularly cheered each other on in tournaments from the crowd. Beau was present for what was arguably the pinnacle of his brother's career when he hit a 9 Darter in a World Championship match against Ian White in December 2013 at Alexandra Palace.

Career

In 2010, Anderson beat Bill Stanley 6–4 to win the Pacific Masters.

In 2013, he won the qualifier for the Sydney Darts Masters, a tournament which saw the top eight on the PDC Order of Merit compete against the best players from Australasia. He faced world number six Andy Hamilton in the first round and lost 4–6. Anderson saw off Tic Bridge 6–4 to claim the 2013 Oceanic Masters which earned him a place in the opening round of the 2014 PDC World Championship, where he beat former world number one Colin Lloyd 3–2 in the first round after winning the deciding set 6–5 in a sudden-death leg. However, he could only win two legs in the second round against Robert Thornton in a 0–4 defeat. In the defence of his Oceanic Masters title he was beaten 5–6 by Rob Szabo in the quarter-finals.

Anderson won the second Dosh Balcatta AGP of 2015 by beating Shane Tichowitsch 6–2 in the final. He only played in the Pacific Masters in 2016, where he lost in the first round.

World Championship results

PDC

 2014: Second round (lost to Robert Thornton 0–4)

References

1982 births
Living people
Australian darts players
Indigenous Australian sportspeople
Noongar people
Professional Darts Corporation associate players